Garrett Droppers (April 12, 1860 – July 7, 1927) was an academic and diplomat from the United States.

Biography
Droppers was born in Milwaukee, Wisconsin to John and Gertrude Droppers on April 12, 1860. He graduated from Harvard University. He first married Cora Rand, who died in 1896, and later married Jean Tewkesbury Rand in 1897.

From 1898 to 1906, he served as president of the University of South Dakota. In 1912, he was a delegate to the Democratic National Convention. Droppers was appointed by Woodrow Wilson as U.S. Ambassador to Greece and Montenegro from 1914 to 1920.

Garrett Droppers died on July 7, 1927, in Williamstown, Massachusetts.

See also
United States Ambassador to Greece
United States Ambassador to Montenegro

References

External links
 

1860 births
1927 deaths
People from Milwaukee
Ambassadors of the United States to Greece
Ambassadors of the United States to Montenegro
Harvard University alumni
Presidents of the University of South Dakota